The Afrasiab murals, also called the Paintings of the Ambassadors, is a rare example of Sogdian art. It was discovered in 1965 when the local authorities decided to construct a road in the middle of Afrāsiāb mound, the old site of pre-Mongol Samarkand. It is now preserved in a special museum on the Afrāsiāb mound.

Description
The paintings date back to the middle of the 7th century CE. They were probably painted between 648 and 651 CE, while the Western Turkic Khaganate, members are well represented in the mural, was in decline and the Tang Dynasty was increasing its territory in Central Asia. Paintings on four walls of the room of a private house at the site depict three or four lands neighbouring Central Asia: On the northern wall, China (a Chinese festival, with the Empress on a boat, and the Emperor hunting); on the Southern Wall, Samarkand (i.e.; the Iranian world: a religious funerary procession in honor of the ancestors during the Nowruz festival); on the eastern wall India (as the land of astrologers and of pygmies, though this painting is largely destroyed).

The topic of the main wall, which depicts Kökturk soldiers escorting ambassadors from various parts of the world (Korea, China, Iranian principalities etc.), is debated. Boris Marshak, a leading expert on Sogdian painting and the excavator of Panjikent, holds that since Sogdian painting always depicts gods on the top of the main wall, the central figure might be the ruler of Samarkand Varkhuman or the goddess Nana. However, as the Turks are guiding the envoys but are not themselves ambassadors, it has been suggested that the painting depicts the Khagan, possibly Ashina Buzhen or more probably Ashina Mishe, might be depicted there.

Description of the four walls
The four walls of the palatial room in Afrasiab seem to depict the four principal civilizations influencing in Central Asia at that time: Chinese, Indian, Iranian, and Turkic. The Chinese chronicles of the Book of the Later Han appears to describe such mural depicting the four civilizations as a common feature in the region:

Inscription mentioning Varhuman and the ambassadors
Inscriptions at the site mention the king of Samarkand Varkhuman. Written in Sogdian, the inscription, reads:

Western Turk officers and courtiers

In contrast with the ambassadors from various countries, the Western Turks in the mural do not bear gifts. They are considered attendants to the scene, and military escorts to the foreign ambassadors. They are recognizable as Turks by their long plaits.

The ambassadors from various countries may have been paying homage both to king Varkhuman and possibly a Western Turk Khagan, both nominal vassals of China. The numerous Turkic officers and courtiers who are present may suggest the predominance of the Western Turks at the court of Samarkand during this time period.

In the mural, the Western Turks are ethnic Turks, Nushibis, rather than Turkicized Sogdians, as suggested by their facial features and faces without beards. They are the most numerous ethnic group in the mural, and are not ambassadors, but rather military attendants. Their depiction offers a unique glimpse into the costumes of the Turks in the 6-7th century CE. They typically wear 3 or 5 long plaits, often gathered together into a single long cloth. They have ankle-long monochromic sleeved coats with two lapels. This fashion for the collar is first seen in Khotan near Turfan, a traditional Turkic area, in the 2nd-4th century CE. They have low black sharp-nosed boots. They wear gold bracelets with lapis lazuli or pearls.

Overview
There are four walls, with murals in various states of preservation. There were two registers, an upper and lower one, but the upper register of the murals was essentially destroyed by bulldozers during the construction works that led to the discovery of the murals.

Various reconstructions for the whole mural have been proposed.

Original murals (details)

Restoration
In early 2014, France declared that it would finance the restoration of the Afrasiab painting.

Turkic period: Kara-Khanid Khanate (999-1212)

A palatial structure dating to the Kara-Khanid Khanate (999-1212) was recently discovered in Afrasiab, complete with numerous decorative paintings dating to circa 1200. This period of artistic florescence would end in 1212, when the Kara-Khanids in Samarkand were conquered by the Kwarazmians. Soon however, Khwarezmia was invaded by the early Mongol Empire and its ruler Genghis Khan destroyed the once vibrant cities of Bukhara and Samarkand. However, in 1370, Samarkand saw a revival as the capital of the Timurid Empire.

See also
 Penjikent murals
 Sogdian art

Sources

References

Royal Nawrūz in Samarkand: Acts of the Conference held in Venice on the Pre-Islamic Afrāsyāb Painting, ed. M. Compareti and E. de La Vaissière, Rome, 2006.

External links
Court art of Sogdian Samarqand in the 7th century AD - images and commentary at the University of Halle

7th-century paintings
1965 archaeological discoveries
Samarkand
Murals
Sogdians
Sogdian art